Yosef Zalman Kleinman (January 1930 – 4 May 2021) was a Slovakian Holocaust survivor, who testified against Adolf Eichmann at his trial.

Early life 
Yosef Zalman Kleinman was born in Slovakia in January 1930.

Kleinman was deported by the occupying Nazi administration to Auschwitz concentration camp, at the age of 14. His father, mother, and sister were killed at the camp.

Eichmann trial 

Kleinman was one of 110 witnesses at the trial of Adolf Eichmann in 1961.

Death
Yosef Kleinman died in Jerusalem on 4 May 2021 at the age of 91.

Book 
חלצת נפשי ממות (Thou hast delivered my soul from death) (2010)

References 

1930 births
2021 deaths
Holocaust survivors
Auschwitz concentration camp survivors
Slovak Jews
Adolf Eichmann